The 1929 United Kingdom general election was held on Thursday 30 May 1929 and resulted in a hung parliament. It stands as the fourth of six instances under the secret ballot, and the first of three under universal suffrage, in which a party has lost on the popular vote but won the highest number (known as "a plurality") of seats versus all other parties – others are 1874, January 1910, December 1910, 1951 and February 1974. In 1929, Ramsay MacDonald's Labour Party won the most seats in the House of Commons for the first time. The Liberal Party re-led by ex-Prime Minister David Lloyd George regained some ground lost in the 1924 election and held the balance of power.

The Election results in Scotland saw a dramatic swing towards the labour party led by Scottish leader Ramsay MacDonald (Although at the time he represented a seat in London). These results followed a general swing towards Labour at this election.

Results

Votes summary

References

1929 in Scotland
1920s elections in Scotland
1929
Scotland